Sarasibala Basu (1886–1929) was a novelist, story teller, poet from the Bengal region of the Indian subcontinent. She belonged to the generation of writers of the Bengali Renaissance. In her short lifespan, she had published more than twenty novels, many short stories and poems, and made a big impact on Bengali literature. An equal quantity of her writings had remained unpublished. Sarasibala wrote passionately about the social issues of that period and the world around her.

Early life
Sarasibala Basu was born in Kolkata in 1886. Her childhood education began in a missionary school and thereafter she was admitted into another school, Mahakali Pathsala, in North Kolkata. After just one year, she was taken out of the school because of the Hindu prejudice of the time against women's education. At home she learned many things by listening to her brother's reading aloud his lessons. After her early marriage around the year 1900, she came to Giridih in Jharkhand. Her liberal minded husband, Phanindranath Basu, engaged a private tutor for her education at home. She also learned English and art from him.

Career
With continuous encouragement from her husband she began to nurture her love of Bengali literature and social work. Her writings, novels and poems, were published in the prestigious periodicals of the day, including, Bharatbarsha, Prabasi, Manashi, and Marmabani. Though she never belonged to the Brahmo Samaj, a social reform movement pioneered by the great Raja Rammohan Roy, its influences are apparent in her writings. She was free from the many prejudices and blind notions of the stagnant Hindu society of her time. Social service and brotherhood of mankind were her most cherished ideals. She became a didi, an elder sister, to many rising stars of Bengali literature, including, Probodh Sanyal, Ashapurna Devi, Narendra Deb, and Nirmal Baral.

Personal life struggle and late life
Sarasibala had a difficult family life, with her husband's modest income she managed to raise her nine children, maintain a kitchen garden, a mangrove, a few cattle and do all the housework, and as much social service to the needy as she could squeeze in. Besides, she could find time to write in the early hours of the morning when others in the house would be sleeping. In her later years, Sarasibala responded to Mahatma Gandhi's call and worked for reform in the Hindu religion, particularly the rejection of the caste system and a society free of caste prejudice. She lectured widely on the promotion of women's education and other social welfare activities. All these activities took toll on her health and she fell a victim to cancer, and died in 1929.

Further reading

 Prabal, A Novel by Sarasibala Basu, Shipra Publications, .

References

1886 births
1929 deaths
Bengali-language writers
Indian women novelists
20th-century Indian novelists
20th-century Indian women writers
Writers from Kolkata
19th-century Indian women writers
19th-century Indian novelists
Women writers from West Bengal
Novelists from West Bengal